Ansley Park is an intown residential district in Atlanta, Georgia, located just east of Midtown and west of Piedmont Park. When developed in 1905-1908, it was the first Atlanta suburban neighborhood designed for automobiles, featuring wide, winding roads rather than the grid pattern typical of older streetcar suburbs. Streets were planned like parkways with extensive landscaping, while Winn Park and McClatchey Park are themselves long and narrow, extending deep into the neighborhood.

Ansley Golf Club borders the district. It has been designated a Historic District on the National Register of Historic Places. In 2008, the median household income for the neighborhood was $226,335. To the immediate east of the golf course is the Eastside Trail interim hiking trail, part of the BeltLine ring of parks and trails around the central city.

History
The area was developed by rail and real estate magnate Edwin P. Ansley, while George W. Adair, Jr. and Forrest Adair marketed the lots. It was marketed as an alternative for the city's elite to Inman Park, the most fashionable residential neighborhood in the city at the time. It was more fashionably located, astride Peachtree Street and adjacent to the city's largest public park. With Edwin Ansley's former residence serving as the governor's mansion and the Piedmont Driving Club adjacent, the area remained upscale until the 1960s when a slight decline was experienced with some residences turning into boarding houses. However, residents turned this decline around and the area never experienced the deep decline in the 1950s-1960s due to suburbanization, as neighborhoods like Inman Park did.

Historic district
Contributing properties in the Historic District include:
 First Church of Christ, Scientist

Education
Ansley Park residents are zoned to schools in the Atlanta Public Schools.

Zoned schools include:
Morningside Elementary School
Inman Middle School
Henry W. Grady High School

Notable people
Charles Brewer, founder of MindSpring
Tom Gugliotta, former NBA player
Al Horford, member of the Atlanta Hawks, and wife Amelia Vega, former Miss Universe
Lonnie Johnson, inventor of the Super Soaker, and Nerf Guns
Hannah Salwen and Kevin Salwen, authors of The Power of Half
Elbert Tuttle, federal judge who played a prominent role in civil rights cases

References

External links

Ansley Park Civic Association
Ansley Park Historic District
 Atlanta, Georgia, a National Park Service Discover Our Shared Heritage Travel Itinerary

Neighborhoods in Atlanta
Historic districts in Metro Atlanta
Historic districts on the National Register of Historic Places in Georgia (U.S. state)
National Register of Historic Places in Atlanta